Luti Fagbenle  (Oladoke Lutiseku Mobolaji Fagbenle) is a British actor, film producer and entrepreneur.

Career
In 2006 Luti founded the production company Luti Media. The company has produced hundreds of music videos, commercials and films. Their work has been honoured with nominations and awards from the MTV VMAs, BAFTA, The MOBO Awards, Virgin Media Shorts, the UKMVAs and others.

Fagbenle's debut film was the 2006 Channel 4 Documentary Nike Midnight Madness narrated by Trevor Nelson.

In 2013 Luti's video for One Direction "Best Song Ever" broke the record on VEVO for views in 24 hours. Vevo announced that the music video delivered 12.3 million views in the 24 hours following its premiere. This beats out the previous record holder, Miley Cyrus's "We Can't Stop," which hit 10.7 million views. The video went on to win Best Video at the 2014 BRIT Awards.

Screen Nation honoured Luti with the Digital Vanguard Award for trailblazing contribution to the British and international online digital media industry at the 2013 Digital-IS Media awards at Google's headquarters.

In 2014 The Luti Media produced video for Iggy Azalea 'Fancy' helped the single reach number one on the Billboard Hot 100, becoming both Azalea's and Charli XCX's first number-one on that chart, holding the spot for seven consecutive weeks. The video was nominated for Best Video at the 2014 MTV Video Music Awards and the 2014 MTV Europe Music Awards

In 2018, with Luti Media's Jamaican production expertise, The Carters created a film (OTR 2) that explores the nature of love, life, sacrifice and changes through the story of Jay-Z and Beyonce.

In 2019 Luti Media produced Maxxx for Channel 4 and Hulu written, directed and starred in by brother OT Fagbenle. Maxxx is a new Sitcom that centres around former famous boy band star turned drug-shamed tabloid laughing stock Maxxx.

In 2021 Luti Media produced Highlife, voted best new TV show 2021 by Cosmopolitan magazine. Highlife new reality TV meets documentary-style show, Highlife follows a group of young and ambitious British West Africans in their every day life.

Personal life
Son of Nigerian journalist Tunde Fagbenle, and British Mother Ally Bedford, Luti is the younger brother of actor O. T. Fagbenle and the older brother of video music director and producer Oladapo Fagbenle; his sister is basketball player Temi Fagbenle.

Television Shows 

In 2019 Luti Fagbenle began producing scripted Television series his debut new comedy series Maxxx for Channel 4 and Hulu. The series was nominated for a RTS award and an Edinburgh TV award. In 2021 he executive produced Docu-ality series Highlife for Channel 4.

In 2021 Luti Fagbenle produced new reality Television series, Highlife. Described as "the first Black British premium reality series", the show premiered on Channel 4 in August 2021.

Music videography

References

External links

English male soap opera actors
Living people
Male actors from London
1985 births
English people of Nigerian descent
English people of Yoruba descent
Yoruba male actors
Yoruba businesspeople
Businesspeople from London
Black British male actors
Yoruba filmmakers